Jeffrey Scott Lacy (born May 12, 1977) is an American former professional boxer who competed from 2001 to 2015. He held the IBF super middleweight title from 2004 to 2006, and the IBO super middleweight title from 2005 to 2006. Lacy rose to prominence in the early to mid-2000s as a feared puncher in the division, with his physique and knockout record making him one of boxing's top-rated prospects at the time.

Amateur career
Lacy had over two hundred fights as an amateur, winning the 1999 National PAL amateur champion at 165 pounds, the 1998 U.S. National amateur champion at 165 pounds, and the 1998 National PAL amateur champion at 165 pounds. Lacy fought at the 1996 Eastern Olympic Trials, stopping Kenneth Head in the first round. In the quarter-finals, Lacy defeated Rubin Williams. In the semi-finals, Lacy lost to Darnell Wilson and finished third.

In the 1997 National Golden Gloves, Lacy again defeated Rubin Williams, but lost against Randy Griffin in the semi-finals and finished in third place. In the quarter-finals of the 2000 Olympic Team trials, Lacy won a decision over Brad Austin. In the semi-finals, Lacy won a decision over Jerson Ravelo. During the finals, Lacy won a 26–10 decision over Randy Griffin.

During the 2000 Olympic Team Box-offs, Lacy lost to Arthur Palac. In his second fight, Lacy defeated him on the scorecards. He was a member of the 2000 United States Olympic boxing team along with future undisputed middleweight champion Jermain Taylor. During his first bout in Sydney, Australia, Lacy knocked out Cleiton Conceição of Brazil at 0:58 of the third round. During his second bout, Lacy defeated Pawel Kakietek of Poland, en route to a 21-7 decision. During the third bout, Lacy was stopped at 1:49 of the third round by Gaidarbek Gaidarbekov of Russia.

Lacy completed an amateur record of 209 wins, 12 losses.

Professional career

Rise to stardom
Lacy made his professional debut against Jerald Lowe on February 2, 2001, knocking him out in the first round. He won his next eight fights by way of knockout and won the WBC Continental Americas super middleweight title against Anwar Oshana, by way of technical knockout in round two.

On July 15, 2003, he won the USBA and NABA super middleweight titles after beating Richard Grant by unanimous decision. He defended all three of his belts against Donnell Wiggins by TKO 8. He later fought Syd Vanderpool for the vacant IBF super middleweight title on October 2, 2004, winning by TKO in 8 rounds. He defended it against Omar Sheika, Rubin Williams, former champion Robin Reid, and Scott Pemberton.

Loss to Joe Calzaghe

On March 5, 2006, at the MEN Arena in Manchester, England, Lacy lost his title to Joe Calzaghe. Despite being a favorite going into the fight, Lacy lost by a unanimous points decision and was knocked down in the twelfth round. Lacy, who had promised a knockout victory pre fight, was the betting favorite largely due to his age and the nature of his recent title defenses. He started the fight very aggressively but was immediately troubled by Calzaghe's work-rate and handspeed. Lacy was hit with a plethora of hurtful punches as Calzaghe managed to consistently land a staggeringly high volume of shots. Lacy continued to try and feint his way in quickly to land his famous left hook but Calzaghe was able to evade or ride the shot. As the match wore on Lacy became increasingly disheartened, and his face a bloody mess. The fight became more and more punishing throughout the middle, and into the later rounds with many expecting the referee to halt the action and save Lacy from such a horrendous beating. To the criticism of onlookers, Lacy's corner continued with the fight in the belief that he could still turn the fight around with one punch. In the end the result was extremely one sided with final scores of 119-105, 119-107 and 119-107. A point deducted from Calzaghe in the 11th round was all that prevented Lacy from losing every round on every card. Many observers have been vocal in their belief that the nature of the loss to Calzaghe meant that Lacy was from then on a shell of his former self.

After Calzaghe
Lacy fought a rematch with Vitali Tsypko on December 2, 2006, in Tampa, Florida, on the same card as Winky Wright's fight against Ike Quartey. This was the second time he had fought Tsypko, the first fight in 2004 which ended in a majority decision. Lacy won the fight by scores of 96-94, 96-94, 95-95. After the bout, it was revealed that Lacy had torn his rotator cuff and was injured throughout most of the fight. Lacy had surgery on the injury and did not fight for a year after the bout.

Lacy returned on December 8, 2007, to defeat Peter Manfredo Jr. by a unanimous decision. On July 23, 2008, beat Epifanio Mendoza by a majority decision. Lacy then fought former world middleweight champion Jermain Taylor on November 15, 2008, and lost the fight by unanimous decision, making it only the second loss of his career.

On April 10, 2009, Jeff Lacy defeated Otis Griffin by a majority decision with the scores of 97-93, 96-94, 95-95.

Loss to Roy Jones Jr. and beyond

On August 15, 2009, Lacy suffered a 10th-round technical knockout to Roy Jones Jr.

Sixteen months after the loss to Jones Jr., Lacy returned to his hometown of St. Petersburg, Florida to face journeyman Dhafir Smith. Smith defeated Lacy by a unanimous decision.

After almost three years after the loss to Smith, Lacy returned on November 30, 2013 to win a 3rd-round TKO over 
Martin Verdin in Baton Rouge, Louisiana.

Jeff Lacy was knocked out on July 10, 2014 by Umberto Savigne.

Jeff Lacy lost by TKO in the 4th round on January 30, 2015 to undefeated contender Sullivan Barrera.

Personal life
Lacy played the role of Malice Blake in the 2007 boxing movie, "The Hammer", starring and produced by Adam Carolla. Jeff is the younger brother of Hydra Lacy and older brother of professional heavyweight Kenny Lacy, middleweight Marshawn Lacy and son of professional heavyweight Hydra Lacy, Sr. In 2018, Lacy sued RaceTrac for trademark infringement for their Left Hook Energy drink.

Professional boxing record

References

External links

1977 births
Living people
African-American boxers
Boxers from Florida
International Boxing Federation champions
Winners of the United States Championship for amateur boxers
Olympic boxers of the United States
Boxers at the 2000 Summer Olympics
American male boxers
International Boxing Organization champions
Light-heavyweight boxers
Middleweight boxers
World super-middleweight boxing champions
21st-century African-American sportspeople
20th-century African-American sportspeople